Okej was a monthly music magazine published in Sweden between 1980 and 2010.

History and profile
Okej was started in 1980. Hans Hatwig was the founder of the magazine, which was based in Stockholm. The magazine was published on a monthly basis. Its target audience was Swedish youth, and the magazine featured articles on pop music. In 1984 it was the best-selling magazine in Sweden. The last issue of Okej appeared in Fall 2010. On 21 January 2011, Kenneth Andrén, the CEO of Egmont essence, announced that the magazine would be shut down.

References

1980 establishments in Sweden
2010 disestablishments in Sweden
Defunct magazines published in Sweden
Magazines established in 1980
Magazines disestablished in 2010
Magazines published in Stockholm
Monthly magazines published in Sweden
Music magazines
Swedish-language magazines
Youth magazines